Margaret Loreta Rudkin (née Fogarty, 1897 –1967) was an American businesswoman who founded Pepperidge Farm and first female member of the board at the Campbell Soup Company.

Early life 
On September 14, 1897, Rudkin was born as Margaret Loreta Fogarty in Manhattan, New York City, New York. Rudkin's parents were Joseph J Fogarty, an Irish clerk, and Margaret Healy. Rudkin was the eldest of her four siblings. Rudkin had reddish hair and green eyes.
Rudkin learned cooking from her grandmother, who started her off with cakes and biscuits. 
At 12, Rudkin moved to Long Island. Rudkin graduated valedictorian from her high school.

Career 
Rudkin started her career as a bank teller. In 1919, Rudkin worked at McClure Jones and Co., where she met her future husband, Henry Albert Rudkin, a stock broker.

In 1926, the two purchased land in Fairfield, Connecticut, built a home and called the estate Pepperidge Farm  after the pepperidge tree "Nyssa sylvatica". Although fairly well off, they suffered somewhat during the Great Depression and made ends meet by selling apples and turkeys.

Margaret Rudkin was inspired to found Pepperidge Farm due to her son Mark's asthma. His reactions to preservatives and artificial ingredients prevented him from eating commercially prepared bread. She created her first product, a whole wheat bread, and offered it to the local doctor, who immediately ordered it to sell to his patients. Rudkin was soon selling it in her town and four months later she was selling it in New York with her husband as delivery man. Soon she was distributing her bread (both whole wheat and white loaves) across the country.

Within three years the endeavor had outgrown the small farm bakery and a large commercial bakery was opened in nearby Norwalk on July 4, 1947. Rudkin designed the interior of the plant herself, positioning the equipment to support her manufacturing process. Although World War II caused problems due to rationing, the bakery was producing 50,000 loaves a week in 1948.

By 1950 Rudkin was appearing in commercials on television. At the same time, under her management the bakery was expanding into other products, including the Goldfish snack.

In 1960, Rudkin was invited to speak about manufacturing to MBA students at Harvard by famed professor Georges Doriot. Her 1963 book, The Margaret Rudkin Pepperidge Farm Cookbook, was the first cookbook to become a national bestseller.

In 1961 Rudkin sold the Pepperidge Farm business to the Camden, NJ based Campbell Soup Company for approximately US$28 million and became a director of that company. Rudkin was the first female member of the board of directors at the Campbell Soup Company. Although having sold Pepperidge Farm, Rudkin still ran the company until her retirement in 1966.

Personal life 
On April 8, 1923, Rudkin married Henry Albert Rudkin, a Wall Street stockbroker. They had three sons. In 1929, Rudkin moved to a property named Pepperidge Farm in Fairfield, Connecticut. On April 22, 1966, Rudkin's husband died at the age of 80. On June 1, 1967, Rudkin died of breast cancer at Yale-New Haven hospital in New Haven, Connecticut. She was 69.

Rudkin is buried in Woodlawn Cemetery in The Bronx, New York City. Her son Mark became a landscape architect known for working on famous gardens in France, such as the Jardins du Nouveau Monde.

See also 
 Pepperidge Farm

References

External links 
 Margaret Rudkin at bookrags.com
 Connecticut Women's Hall of Fame
 Pepperidge Farm history
 The Margaret Rudkin Pepperidge Farm Cookbook, Atheneum 1963
 New York Times article, June 2, 1967
 Garden Design article

1897 births
1967 deaths
American food industry business executives
People from Fairfield, Connecticut
Businesspeople from New York City
Burials at Mountain Grove Cemetery, Bridgeport
American food company founders
Burials at Woodlawn Cemetery (Bronx, New York)
20th-century American businesspeople
20th-century American businesswomen